SSM are an American garage punk band from Detroit, Michigan, United States, who are signed to Alive Records and feature members of The Hentchmen, The Sights and The Cyril Lords.

Career
Taking their band name from their last names, the post-punk trio, SSM, are composed of John Szymanski (vocals, keyboards), Dave Shettler (drums) and Marty Morris (vocals, guitar). They are known for their work with The Hentchmen, The Sights, and The Cyril Lords, respectively, before creating SSM in mid-2005. Their debut album, SSM, was released in 2006 to much acclaim. After touring with fellow Detroit rockers, The Von Bondies, the band released Break Your Arm For Evolution in January 2008.

Members
John Szymanski - Keys, Vox
David Shettler - Percussion
Marty Morris - Guitar, Vox

Discography

Albums
SSM (2006)
Break Your Arm For Evolution (2008)
SSM (2010)

External links
SSM on Alive Records
SSM on MySpace
Howl Records - Official Website

Alive Naturalsound Records artists
Garage rock groups from Michigan
Garage punk groups
Indie rock musical groups from Michigan
Musical groups from Detroit